Birtley is a hamlet in Shropshire, England. It is situated a short distance to the west of the village of Ticklerton, in countryside to the south-east of the market town of Church Stretton.

References

External links

Geograph.org.uk — SO4790

Villages in Shropshire